Gaurela-Pendra-Marwahi district is a district in the Indian state of Chhattisgarh. Gaurella is the headquarters of the district. It was carved out of Bilaspur district and inaugurated in February 2020.

Geography 
Gaurela-Pendra-Marwahi district is bordered by Koriya and Korba districts to the east, Bilaspur and Mungeli districts to the south, and Anuppur district of Madhya Pradesh to the northwest. The district is predominantly mountainous.

History 
The district was formerly under the rule of the Haihaiyas until Bhaskar Pant of the Marathas defeated them. The Marathas then administered the region until the British victory in the Third Anglo-Maratha War in 1818. The British then created Bilaspur district including the current territory of Gaurela-Pendra-Marwahi district. Chhattisgarh Mitra, the first newspaper of Chhattisgarh in this district, was published in the form of a monthly magazine from Pendra in the year 1900 under the editing of Pandit Madhavrao Sapre

Demographics 

At the time of the 2011 census, the district had a population of 3,36,420. Gaurela-Pendra-Marwahi district has a sex ratio of 997 females per 1000 males and a literacy rate of 55.92%. 32,285 (9.60%) live in urban areas. Scheduled Castes and Scheduled Tribes make up 20,802 (6.18%) and 192,073 (57.09%) of the population respectively.

According to the 2011 census, 74.59% of the district speaks Chhattisgarhi and 23.48% speaks Hindi as their first language.

Villages 
 

Meduka

See also 
 Districts of Chhattisgarh

References 

 
Districts of Chhattisgarh